Roy Addison (17 February 1939 – 22 February 2021) was a British boxer.

Biography
He competed in the 1960 Summer Olympics in the middleweight classification. Addison won the 1960 Amateur Boxing Association British middleweight title, when boxing for the Royal Air Force.

He owned a business called Addison Tyres and died in February 2021.

1960 Olympic results
 Round of 32: bye
 Round of 16: lost to Hans Buchi (Switzerland) by decision, 1-4.

References

1939 births
2021 deaths
Boxers at the 1960 Summer Olympics
British male boxers
Olympic boxers of Great Britain
Sportspeople from Tipton
Middleweight boxers